The Greater Cleveland Conference is an OHSAA league that began in the 2015–2016 school year.

Member Schools
This group of schools uses the name "Greater Cleveland Conference" as Mentor retained the rights to the name from their previous tenure in the GCC.   The initial seven members left the Northeast Ohio Conference (NOC) while Euclid came over from the Lake Erie League.

Future members

History
The original lineup of the Greater Cleveland Conference began in 2015 with Brunswick, Elyria, Euclid, Medina, Mentor, Shaker Heights, Solon, and Strongsville. Shaker Heights announced in January 2019 that they would leave the GCC to rejoin the Lake Erie League for the 2020–21 school year.  The district cited "new and improved leadership in the LEL, better geography and travel times, but also diversity/cultural sensitivity issues" as reasons for leaving. On January 16, 2020, Elyria accepted an invitation to leave for the Southwestern Conference, effective in 2021. These departures left the league with six schools for the 2021–22 and 2022–23 school years.

A unanimous vote on April 13, 2022, granted approval for Cleveland Heights and Shaker Heights of the Lake Erie League to join the conference beginning with the 2023-24 school year. Later that year in September, Solon announced plans to leave for the Suburban League, at the conclusion of the current school year, a year earlier than conference bylaws allowed. At its December 2022 meeting, the GCC approved Solon's departure for all sports except for football, citing difficulties scheduling with seven teams. Under the agreement, Solon football will play the 2023 season in the GCC while all other sports will begin play in the Suburban League. Football will join the Suburban League in 2024.

References

Ohio high school sports conferences
Sports in Greater Cleveland
2015 establishments in Ohio
Organizations established in 2015